The National Road Corridor Historic District is a historic district in eastern Wheeling, West Virginia. The district encompasses a  section of the National Road from Park View Lane to Bethany Pike. A primarily residential area, the district includes the homes of some of Wheeling's wealthiest residents of the late 19th century and early 20th century. The homes are generally situated on large lots and were designed in popular architectural styles of the period, including Queen Anne, Colonial Revival, Italianate, Shingle Style, Classical Revival, Mission Revival, and Tudor Revival. Frederick F. Faris and Edward B. Franzheim, both significant Wheeling architects, each designed multiple homes along the road. The district also includes two cemeteries, Greenwood Cemetery and Mount Calvary Cemetery; Hornbrook Park (Wheeling Park), the site of a Madonna of the Trail monument and a Civil War memorial; Triadelphia High School, also designed by Faris; and three churches.

The district was added to the National Register of Historic Places on February 11, 1993.

References

External links

Queen Anne architecture in West Virginia
Colonial Revival architecture in West Virginia
National Register of Historic Places in Wheeling, West Virginia
National Road
Historic districts on the National Register of Historic Places in West Virginia
Roads on the National Register of Historic Places in Virginia